Sciadonus galatheae is a species of fish in the family Aphyonidae.

Description
It has 88–104 dorsal fin rays and 47–58 anal fin rays. It has 48 precaudal vertebrae.

Habitat
It has been found in the Celtic Sea, the Solomon Sea and in the waters off New Zealand.

Behaviour
Sciadonus galatheae reproduces viviparously.

References

Aphyonidae
Taxa named by Jørgen G. Nielsen
Fish described in 1969